Juozas Petkevičius (born 8 April 1948, Inturkė) is Lithuanian basketball coach, masseur, and former rugby player. He is often regarded as mascot of Lithuanian national basketball team.

In 2014, Petkevičius was one of the contestants in Lithuanian version of reality show Celebrity Splash! called Šuolis!.

Career
 1992–present Lithuania national basketball team: masseur
 1994–1999 Atletas Kaunas: coach, masseur (LKL)
 1999–2000 Alita Alytus: masseur (LKL)
 2000–2008 Lietuvos rytas Vilnius: masseur (LKL)
 Perlas Vilnius
 2017–present Lietuvos rytas Vilnius: physiotherapist, masseur (LKL)

Personal life
Wife Vilija, son Vaidas and daughter Miglė.

References

External links
 krepsinis.net profile

1948 births
Living people
Lithuanian basketball coaches